= Zimbabwe Association of Microfinance Institutions =

Zimbabwean government institute

- Formation: 1999
- Purpose: To advocate for an enabling regulatory and funding environment and to promote best practices in the provision of demand- driven services for the growth of the Microfinance industry in Zimbabwe
- Headquarters: Harare
- Location: Harare, Zimbabwe
- Official language: English
- Executive Director: Mr. Godfrey C. Chitambo
- Finance & Administration Officer: Ms. Judith Nyanderu
- Key people: Mrs. Virginia Sibanda, Mr. Vote Muza, Mr. Morris Mpala, Mrs. Mildred Chirwa, Mrs. Molly Dingani
- Website: http://www.zamfi.org/

The Zimbabwe Association of Microfinance Institutions (ZAMFI) is a government institution established in 1999 with the aim of advocating for an enabling regulatory and funding environment and to promote best practices in the provision of demand-driven services for the growth of the Microfinance industry in Zimbabwe.

== Membership ==
Membership is open to all licensed practitioners who are into microlending. These include commercial banks, microfinance funders, microfinance banks, credit only microfinance institutions, savings and credit cooperatives. There are subscriptions paid by members. In 2014, the organization had 68 member MFIs in the country.

== Governance ==
ZAMFI is governed by a board of directors, and these are democratically elected from the existing ZAMFI members. The Board Chairperson is Mrs. Virginia Sibanda.

The other board members are Mr. Vote Muza, Mr. Morris Mpala, Mrs. Mildred Chirwa, and Mrs. Molly Dingani.
